This is a list of notable Norwegian Americans, including both original immigrants who obtained American citizenship and their American descendants.

The list is ordered by category of human endeavour. Persons with significant contributions in two fields are listed in both of the pertinent categories, to facilitate easy lookup.

To be included in this list, the person must have a Wikipedia article showing they are Norwegian American or must have references showing they are Norwegian American and are notable.

List

Academics 
 Burton Hatlen – (1936–2008) American literary scholar and professor at the University of Maine
 C. R. Hagen – professor of particle physics at the University of Rochester
 Hans-Jørgen Holman – (1925–1986) Norwegian-American musicologist and educationalist
 Robert Haugen – (1942–2013) financial economist and pioneer in the field of quantitative investing
 Lloyd Hustvedt – (1922–2004) Norwegian-born American professor and scholar of history
 Jakob Larsen – (1888–1974) American classical scholar
 David T. Lykken – (1928–2006) behavioral geneticist and Professor Emeritus of Psychology and Psychiatry at the University of Minnesota)
 Paul Nystrom – (1878–1969) professor of marketing at Columbia University
 Carleton Opgaard – (1929–2014) American college and university administrator and founding president of Vancouver Island University
 Reidar Fauske Sognnaes – (1911–1984) Dean of the Harvard School of Dental Medicine, founding Dean of the UCLA School of Dentistry and world-renowned scholar in the field of oral pathology

Historians and sociologists 
 Kenneth O. Bjork – (1909–1991) American professor, historian and author
 Carl Blegen – (1887–1971) American archaeologist famous for his work on the site of Pylos in modern-day Greece and Troy in modern-day Turkey.
 Theodore C. Blegen – (1891–1969) American historian and author
 Elise M. Boulding – (1920–2010) Quaker sociologist Norwegian, and author credited as a major contributor to creating the academic discipline of Peace and Conflict Studies
 Odd S. Lovoll – American author, historian and educator
 Peter A. Munch – (1908–1984) Norwegian-American sociologist, educator and author
 Carlton C. Qualey – (1904–1988) American professor, author and historian
 Rick Steves – American author, historian
 Martin Ulvestad – (1865–1942) American historian and author whose writings focused on Norwegian-American immigration
 Thorstein Veblen – (1857–1929) American economist and sociologist

Architects 
 Gene Amdahl – Norwegian-born computer architect and hi-tech entrepreneur
 George Awsumb – Norwegian-born, prominent American architect of 20th century
 George Bergstrom – American architect most noted for his design work on the Pentagon in Arlington County, Virginia.
 Frederick William Cappelen – (1857–1921) Norwegian-born architect and civil engineer who held the office of Minneapolis City Engineer
 George Dahl – (1894–1987) prominent American architect of 20th century.
 Joachim Goschen Giæver – (1856–1925) Civil engineer involved in the construction of the framework to Statue of Liberty
 Jon Jerde – American architect
 Peter Johnsen
 Henry Orth – (1866–1946) American architect

Entertainment

Actors and actresses 

 John Aasen – (1890–1938) American silent film actor, one of the tallest actors in history.
 Jean Arthur – (1900–1991) American actress and a major film star of the 1930s and 1940s
 Nina Arvesen – American actress of Norwegian extraction, best known for her performances on American soap operas.
 Richard Dean Anderson – American television and film actor, producer and composer.
 James Arness – (1923–2011) American actor, best known for portraying Marshal Matt Dillon in the television series Gunsmoke, of part Norwegian descent and was brother of actor Peter Graves.
 Dorothy Arnold – (1917–1997) American film actress.
 Roger Awsumb – (1928–2002) American television host "Casey Jones" for the Lunch with Casey children's show.
 Earl W. Bascom – (1906–1995) cowboy actor, worked with Roy Rogers, grandmother was Norwegian
 Rowan Blanchard – American actress
 Stan Boreson – "King of Scandinavian Humor"
 James Cagney – (1899–1986) American actor, first on stage, then in film, grandfather was of Norwegian descent
 Dana Carvey – American comedian, actor and producer, 7/16ths Norwegian
 Jennifer Connelly – American film actress, father is of Irish and Norwegian, mother was of Ashkenazi Jewish descent
 Erika Christensen – American actress, father is of part Norwegian descent
 Lauren Cohan – American actress
 Arlene Dahl – American actress and former MGM contract star, mother of actor Lorenzo Lamas.
 Laura Dern – American actress 
 Tom Drake – (1918–1982) American actor
 Josh Duhamel – American actor and former fashion model, of part Norwegian descent
 Linda Eder – American singer and actress
 Dana Elcar – (1927–2005) American television and movie character actor.
 Linda Evans – American actress
 Jimmy Fallon – American television host, comedian, actor, singer, writer, and producer (Norwegian maternal great-grandfather).
 Bob Fosse – (1927–1987) American actor, dancer, musical theater choreographer, director, screenwriter, film editor and film director.
 Kristine Froseth – American actress and model of full Norwegian descent
 Peter Graves (actor) – (1926–2010) American film and television actor, of part Norwegian descent
 Sigrid Gurie – (1911–1969) Norwegian-born motion picture actress from the late 1930s to early 1940s
 Carmine Giovinazzo – American actor and singer, best known for his role as Detective Danny Messer in CSI: NY.  He is of Norwegian and Italian descent
 Melanie Griffith – American actress, mother is of part Norwegian descent
 Josh Hartnett – American actor
 June Havoc – (1912–2010) Canadian-born American actress, dancer, writer, and theater director
 Tricia Helfer - Canadian American actress
 Lance Henriksen – American actor and artist, Norwegian father
 Celeste Holm – (1917–2012) American stage, film, and television actress
 Jon-Erik Hexum – (1957–1984) American model and actor.
 Jean Kasem – actress and widow of Casey Kasem
 Marta Kristen – American actress
 Lorenzo Lamas – American actor and reality television participant, mother of Norwegian descent
 Carole Landis – (1919–1948) American film and stage actress
 Gypsy Rose Lee – (1914–1970) American burlesque entertainer famous for her striptease act.

 Lucille Lund – (1913–2002) American film actress of the 1930s.
 Dawn Lyn – American actress best known for her role in three seasons of the comedy My Three Sons.
 Kristanna Loken – American actress known for her work in both film and television, and as a fashion model, is of half Norwegian and half German descent
 John Lund – (1911–1992) American film actor who is probably best remembered for his role in the film A Foreign Affair
 Jena Malone – actress, of part Norwegian descent
 Kimberly Matula – actress best known for her role as Hope Logan on CBS’s The Bold and the Beautiful.
 Peter MacNicol – American actor (Ally McBeal)
 Virginia Mayo – (1920–2005) American film actress.
 Jenny Maxwell – (1941–1981) American film and television actress, probably best remembered for her role in the 1961 Elvis Presley film Blue Hawaii
 Robert Mitchum – (1917–1997) American film actor, author, composer and singer, of half Norwegian descent
 Christopher Mitchum – American actor. He is the second son of film star Robert Mitchum and younger brother of actor James Mitchum, father was of half Norwegian descent
 James Mitchum – American actor and son of Robert Mitchum, father was of half Norwegian descent
 Marilyn Monroe – (1926–1962) American actress, singer and model, of part Norwegian descent
 Harry Morgan – (1915–2011) American actor
 Patricia Morison – American stage and motion picture actress and mezzo-soprano singer
 Kari Michaelsen – American actress. She is most known by her role as Katie Kanisky on the television sitcom Gimme a Break!.
 Mildred Natwick – (1905–1994) American stage and film actress
 Barry Nelson  – (1917–2007) American actor (James Bond).
 Nathan Fillion – actor
 Greta Nissen – (1906–1988) Norwegian-born American film and stage actress.
 Dagmar Oakland – (1893–1989) American actress
 Eric Christian Olsen American actor known for his role in NCIS: Los Angeles . 100% Norwegian.
 Ashley Olsen - Actress, produser, fashion designer and businesswoman. Is the twin sister of Mary-Kate Olsen and elder sister of Elizabeth Olsen
 Mary-Kate Olsen - Actress, produser, fashion designer and businesswoman. Is the twin sister of Ashley Olsen and elder sister of Elizabeth Olsen
 Elizabeth Olsen - Actress, younger sister of twins Mary-Kate and Ashley Olsen
 Barbara Payton – American fashion model and actress, parents of Norwegian descent
 Piper Perabo – American stage, film and television actress, mother is of Norwegian descent
Chris Pratt – American Actor of English, German, Swiss-German, French-Canadian and Norwegian descent.
 Priscilla Presley American actress and businesswoman and ex-wife of musician Elvis Presley, of part Norwegian descent

 John Qualen – (1899–1987) Canadian-American character actor of Norwegian heritage who specialized in Scandinavian roles.
 Evan Ross – American actor and musician, father was Norwegian
 Kathryn Leigh Scott – American television and film actress
 Kevin Sorbo – American actor (Hercules: The Legendary Journeys), of part Norwegian descent
 Ann Reinking – American actress, dancer, and choreographer
 Sonia Satra – American actress
 David Soul – American-British actor and singer, best known for his role as Detective Kenneth "Hutch" Hutchinson in the television programme Starsky and Hutch
 Sally Struthers – American actress and spokeswoman (Gloria Stivic on All in the Family and as Babette on Gilmore Girls).
 Harry Tenbrook – Norwegian-American actor
 Max Thieriot – American actor
 Justin Torkildsen – American actor, best known for his role on The Bold and the Beautiful
 Aaron Tveit – theatre, television, and film actor
 Kirsten Vangsness – American actress (Criminal Minds)
 Shantel VanSanten – American actress
 Vicky Vette – pornographic actress and model
 Robert Wagner – American actor best known for the Hart to Hart TV series.
 Kristen Wiig – American film and television actress, paternal grandfather was of Norwegian descent
 Michelle Williams – American film and television actress, of part Norwegian descent
 Rainn Wilson – American actor
 Renée Zellweger – American actress and producer, mother is Norwegian-born, and of part Norwegian descent

Screenwriters, directors and producers of film 
 John G. Avildsen – American film director
 Janae Bakken – American television producer and screenwriter best known for her work on the television series Scrubs
 Kathryn Bigelow – American director
 Ron Hauge – American television writer
 Brian Helgeland – American screenwriter, film producer and director
 Richard Christian Matheson – novelist, screenwriter and producer
 Richard Matheson (1926–2013) – American author and screenwriter
 Sarah Cameron Sunde – American theatrical director

Singers and musicians 

 Liz Anderson – American country music singer
 Lynn Andersen – American country music singer and equestrian
 The Andrews Sisters
 Peter Askim – American composer of modern classical music
 Sophie Auster – American singer and actress
 Chet Baker – (1929–1988) American jazz trumpeter, flugelhornist and singer.
 Beck – American musician, singer-songwriter and multi-instrumentalist
 Stan Boreson – the "King of Scandinavian Humor"
 Jackson Browne – American rock singer-songwriter and musician
 Storm Bull – (1913–2007) American musician, composer and educator
 Jerry Cantrell – American musician, lead guitarist of Alice in Chains
 F. Melius Christiansen – (1871–1955) Norwegian-born violinist and choral conductor in the Lutheran choral tradition
 Paul J. Christiansen – (1914–1997) American choral conductor and composer
 David Ellefson – bassist and founding member of the American band Megadeth
 Bradley Ellingboe – American choral composer and conductor
 Myron Floren – (1919–2005) American musician best known as the accordionist on The Lawrence Welk Show
 Leif Garrett – American singer and actor
 Josh Groban – American singer-songwriter (great-grandmother of Norwegian descent)
 Marty Haugen – American composer of liturgical music
 Skitch Henderson – (1918–2005) pianist, conductor, and composer
 Bibbe Hansen – artist, musician, and former actress best known as the mother of musician Beck
 Adolph Herseth – principal trumpet in the Chicago Symphony Orchestra from 1948 until 2001
 Nick Hexum – American musician, currently the vocalist and guitarist for the 311 band
 Josh Homme – American rock musician and record producer
 David Johansen – American rock, protopunk, blues, and pop singer, well as a songwriter and actor
 Ardis Krainik – (1929–1997) American mezzo-soprano opera singer
 Adam Lambert – American singer
 Peggy Lee – (1920–2002) American jazz and popular music singer, songwriter, composer, and actress
 DJ Muggs – Cypress Hill's DJ and producer
 Brent Mydland – (1952–1990) fourth keyboardist to play for the American rock band the Grateful Dead
 Joni Mitchell – Canadian musician, songwriter, and painter that resident in New York
 Spencer Nilsen – video game music composer
 Renee Olstead – American actress and singer
 Malia Ann Kawailanamalie Petersen – Hula Halau 'O Kamuela dancer
 Robin Pecknold – songwriter, lead singer of American indie folk band Fleet Foxes
 Lisa Marie Presley – singer-songwriter and daughter of Elvis Presley
 Iggy Pop – American singer, songwriter, musician, and occasional actor
 Gregg Rolie – American keyboardist, organist, and singer, who is one of the founding members of the bands Santana, The Storm, Abraxas Pool and Journey, for whom he was the original lead singer.
 Alia Shawkat – American actress (Arrested Development)
 Grace Slick – American singer and songwriter, one of the lead singers of the rock groups The Great Society, Jefferson Airplane, Jefferson Starship, and Starship
 Matt Sorum – American rock drummer and percussionist. He works with Guns N' Roses and Velvet Revolver
 Gwen Stefani – American singer-songwriter, fashion designer and occasional actress. (maternal second great-grandmother parents)
 Harry Stewart – (1908–1956) American comedian and singer
 Axel Stordahl – (1913–1963) arranger active from the late 1930s through the 1950s
 Carl Frederick Tandberg – (1910–1988) bass fiddle musician (Glen Campbell)
Robin Thicke - singer. His mother is of partial Norwegian ancestry
 Tinashe – singer
 Peter Tork – American musician and actor, best known as a member of The Monkees
 Eddie Vedder - best known as the lead vocalist of the American rock band Pearl Jam. Vedder was born Edward Louis Severson III
 Paul Waaktaar-Savoy – lyricist, singer, and guitar player from the band a-ha and Savoy. He was born in Oslo and moved to New York after meeting his girlfriend (now wife), Lauren Savoy.
 Tom Waits – American singer-songwriter, composer, and actor
 Camilla Wicks – American violinist and one of the first female violinists to establish a major international career
 Okay Kaya - American singer, songwriter, model, and actor. Most known as OKAY KAYA, her stage name
 Vera Zorina – (1917–2003) Norwegian ballerina, musical theatre actress and choreographer

Models 
 Lauren Anderson
 Brooke Berry
 Jo Collins – Playboy Magazine's Playmate of the Month
 CariDee English – American fashion model and TV personality
 Patti Hansen – American model and actress
 Nicky Hilton – American fashion model, socialite, celebutante, and fashion designer
 Dakota Johnson – American fashion model and actress, daughter of actors Don Johnson and Melanie Griffith
 Surrey Marshe
 Leeann Tweeden – American model
 Nikki Ziering – American model and actress
 Christine Teigen – American model
 Lindsay Ellingson - American model

Sport 

 Lance Armstrong – American former professional road racing cyclist
 Gil Andersen (1879–1935) – Norwegian-born racecar driver active during the formative years of auto racing
 Craig Anderson – American NHL goaltender
 John Anderson (1873–1949) – Major League Baseball outfielder and first baseman
 Lisa Aukland (born 1957) – professional bodybuilder and powerlifter
 Espen Baardsen – former footballer
 Jim Bakken – former American football punter and placekicker
 Jill Bakken – American Olympic bobsledder
 Ole Bardahl
 Earl W. Bascom (1906–1995) – hall of fame rodeo champion, "Father of Modern Rodeo"
 Tom Brady – American NFL quarterback for the New England Patriots and Tampa Bay Buccaneers
 Walter Burkemo – American professional golfer
 Dustin Byfuglien – American NHL defenseman
 George Dahlgren (1887–1940) – player in the National Football League
 Mix Diskerud – Norwegian-born American soccer player currently playing for MLS club New York City FC
 Grete Eliassen – American freestyle skier; Norwegian father
 Audun Endestad – Norwegian-born American cross-country skier, author, and field guide
 Alf Engen (1909–1997) – Norwegian-born skier and skiing school owner/teacher; set several ski jumping world records in the 1930s
 Corey Engen (1916–2006) – captain of the U.S. Nordic ski team at the 1948 Winter Olympics in St. Moritz, Switzerland
 Sverre Engen (1911–2001) – Norwegian-born skier, ski coach, ski area manager, and filmmaker
 Hal Erickson (1898–1963) – player in the National Football League
 Stein Eriksen – former alpine ski racer and Olympic gold medalist
 Gretchen Fraser (1919–1994) – Alpine ski racer, the first American to win an Olympic gold medal for skiing
 Sig Haugdahl (1891–1970) – IMCA champion 1927–1932 and an early promoter of stock car racing in the United States
 Anders Haugen (1888–1984) – American ski jumper
 Greg Haugen – retired American boxer
 Michael Haugen Jr. – professional ten-pin bowler
 Art Hauger (1893–1944) – Major League Baseball player
 Sonja Henie (1912–1969) – Norwegian figure skater and film star
 Hjalmar Hvam (1902–1996) – competitive Norwegian-American Nordic skier and inventor of the first safety ski binding
 Burt Ingwersen (1898–1969) – American football, basketball, and baseball player
 Kenneth Di Vita Jensen – Norwegian-born American soccer player
 Si Johnson (1906–1994) – pitcher for the Cincinnati Reds
 Lolo Jones – American track and field athlete who specialized in the 60 and 100-meter hurdles
 Art Jorgens (1905–1980) – catcher in Major League Baseball
 Sonny Jurgensen – former American football quarterback in the National Football League
 Brandon Inge – American professional baseball infielder
 Jay Kleven (1949–2009) – Major League Baseball player in 1976 for the New York Mets
 Don Larsen (1929–2020) – American Major League Baseball pitcher who threw a perfect game in the 1956 World Series
 Newt Loken – former artistic gymnast and coach of gymnastics, trampolining, and cheerleading
 Harold "Hal" W. Moe (1910–2001) – American college football player and assistant coach
 Tommy Moe – former alpine ski racer
 Doug Moe – American professional basketball coach
 Sondre Norheim (1825–1897) – Norwegian skier and pioneer of modern skiing
 Werner Nilsen (1904–1992) – Norwegian-American soccer forward
 Casper Oimoen (1906–1995) – American ski jumping champion
 John Olerud – American former first baseman in Major League Baseball
 Ole Olsen (1894–1980) – Major League Baseball pitcher
 Greg Olson – American football coach
 Lute Olson – retired American men's basketball coach
 Peter Oppegard – American retired pair skater and coach
 Danica Patrick – American auto racing driver,  model, and advertising spokeswoman
 Sarah Reinertsen – American athlete
 Earl Sande (1898–1968) – American Hall of Fame jockey and thoroughbred horse trainer
 Eddie August Schneider (1911–1940) – set three transcontinental airspeed records for pilots under the age of twenty-one in 1930
 Knute Rockne (1888–1931) – American football coach
 Ed Saugestad – former college men's ice hockey coach
 Bjørn Selander – American racing cyclist
 Jack Skille – American professional ice hockey player for the Florida Panthers of the National Hockey League
 Karsten Solheim (1911–2000) – Norwegian-born American golf club designer and businessman
 Carl Tellefsen (1854–1908) – Norwegian-born skiing champion and the first leader of the U.S. Ski and Snowboard Association
 Jimmy "Big Jim" Wiggs (1876–1963) – pitcher in Major League Baseball
 Jan Stenerud – former professional football player for the American Football League's Kansas City Chiefs
 Snowshoe Thompson (1827–1876) – considered the father of California skiing
 Arthur E. Tokle (1922–2005) – Norwegian-born American ski jumper
 Torger Tokle (1919–1945) – Norwegian-born ski jumper; the Torger Tokle Memorial Trophy was created in his honor after he was killed while serving as a ski trooper in World War II
 Lindsey Vonn – American alpine skier
 Johnny Weir – American figure skater
 Babe Didrikson Zaharias (1911–1956) – American athlete who achieved outstanding success in golf, basketball, and track and field
 Brede Hangeland

Bankers 
 Arthur E. Andersen – (1885–1947) founder of the accounting firm Arthur Andersen LLP.
 Richard W. Fisher – President and CEO of the Federal Reserve Bank of Dallas
 Helge Alexander Haugan – (1847–1909) American banking executive in Chicago, Illinois.
 Gabriel Hauge – (1914–1981) prominent American bank executive and economist.
 John Paulson – (born 1955) President and founder of Paulson & Co.
 John Westergaard – (1931–2003) stock analyst and founder of the Westergaard Fund, also political advisor to Senator Daniel Patrick Moynihan

Business 
 Linda Avey — Founder of 23andMe, the consumer genetics company
 Simon Benson – (1852–1942) noted businessman and philanthropist
 Alden W. Clausen – former President of the World Bank
 
 William Copeland (brewer), Copeland was born Johan Martinius Thoresen in Arendal in Norway before he moved to USA. He set up a brewery in Japan which today is known as Kirin Beer.
 Ralph Evinrude – (1907–1986) American business magnate best known for being the Chairman of Outboard Marine Corporation
 H. P. Faye – (1859–1928) Norwegian-born businessman who developed sugar cane plantations on west Kauai
 Gary Haugen – President and CEO of International Justice Mission
 H. G. Haugan – Norwegian-born, American railroad´s executive
 Barron Hilton – American socialite, hotel heir, former co-chairman of the Hilton Hotels chain
 Conrad Hilton – (1887–1979) American hotelier and founder of the Hilton Hotels chain
 Conrad Hilton, Jr. – (1926–1969) American socialite, hotel heir, businessman
 Richard Hilton – Chairman and co-founder of Hilton & Hyland
 Turi Josefsen – Norwegian-born, American businesswoman
 Fred Kavli – Norwegian and naturalized American physicist, business leader, inventor, and philanthropist
 N. O. Nelson – (1844–1922) the founder of the N. O. Nelson Manufacturing Company
 Kjell Qvale – Norwegian- born business executive
 Tova Traesnaes – Norwegian-born American business-woman. She is the founder of the Beauty By Tova cosmetics featured on QVC
 James Trane – (1857–1936) the co-founder of Trane
 Reuben Trane – (1886–1954) founded Trane, the heating and air conditioning company, with his father James Trane

Cartoonists 

 Carl Thomas Anderson – (1865–1948) American cartoonist best remembered for his comic strip Henry.
 Matt Groening – American cartoonist, screenwriter, and producer. He is the creator of the comic strip Life in Hell as well as two successful television series, The Simpsons and Futurama.
 Grim Natwick – (1890–1990) American artist, animator and film director (Betty Boop)
 Charles M. Schulz – (1922–2000) American cartoonist, creator of comic strip Peanuts

Explorers and founders 
 Carl Ben Eielson – (1897–1929) aviator, bush pilot and explorer
 Jafet Lindeberg – (1873–1962) gold prospector and co-founder of the city of Nome, Alaska
 Finn Ronne – (1899–1980) U.S. Antarctic explorer.
 Erik Ramstad – (1860–1951) one of the founders of Minot, North Dakota

Journalist 

 Waldemar Ager –  (1869–1941) Norwegian-born American newspaperman and author
 Brynild Anundsen – (1844–1913) Norwegian-born American newspaper editor and publisher
 Ole Amundsen Buslett – (1855–1924) Norwegian-born American author, newspaperman, and politician
 William T. Evjue – (1882–1970) American newspaper editor and radio broadcast executive.
 Hans Andersen Foss – (1851–1929) American author, newspaper editor and temperance leader
 Tavi Gevinson – American fashion journalist and blogger
 Gulbrand Hagen – (1864–1919) American newspaper editor, writer, photographe
 Johan Hambro – (1915–1993) Norwegian journalist, translator and biographer
 Vernon Arnold Haugland – (1908–1984) Reporter and writer for Associated Press. As a war correspondent, he documented World War II events as they occurred. He was the first civilian to receive the Silver Star medal.
 Carl Hiaasen – American journalist, columnist and novelist
 Reidar Rye Haugan – (1893–1972) American newspaper editor and publisher
 Judy Lee Klemesrud – (1939–1985) writer for The New York Times from 1966 until her death in 1985
 Victor Lawson – (1850–1925) American newspaper publisher who headed the Chicago Daily News from 1876 to 1925
 Elias Molee – (1845–1928) American journalist, philologist and linguist.
 Jane Pauley – American television journalist
 James DeNoon Reymert – (1821–1896) American newspaper editor, mine operator, lawyer and politician
 Jerry Rosholt – (1923–2008) American journalist and author
 Andreas Nilsen Rygg – (1868–1951) Norwegian-American newspaper editor and author
 Orion Samuelson – (born 1934) Norwegian-American broadcaster, host of the U.S. Farm Report
 Eric Sevareid – (1912–1992) CBS news journalist from 1939 to 1977
 Carl Søyland – (1894–1978) Norwegian-born author, reporter, editor
 Marcus Thrane – (1817–1890) Norwegian author, journalist, and the leader of the first Norwegian labor movement
 Brenda Ueland – (1891–1985) American journalist, writers and editor. Awarded the Knight of Royal Norwegian Order of St. Olav by the Norwegian government for her covering of the treason trials of Vidkun Quisling.
 Johannes B. Wist – (1864–1923) Norwegian-born newspaper editor, journalist and author

Lawyers 

 Adolph M. Christianson – (1877–1954) justice of the North Dakota Supreme Court.
 Harvey B. Knudson – (1903–1978) Justice on the North Dakota Supreme Court
 Egil Krogh – (1939–2020) American lawyer who became famous as an official of the Richard Nixon
 Arthur Larson – (1910–1993) American lawyer, law professor, United States Under Secretary of Labor from 1954 to 1956, director of the United States Information Agency from 1956 to 1957, and Executive Assistant to the President for Speeches from 1957 to 1958.
 Mary Pawlenty – former American state court judge who served on Minnesota's First Judicial District
 Aad J. Vinje – (1857–1929) justice on the Wisconsin Supreme Court
 Earl Warren – (1891–1974) 14th Chief Justice of the United States Supreme Court and one of only two people to be elected Governor of California three times

Meteorologists 
 Jacob Bjerknes – (1897–1975) Norwegian-born meteorologist.
 Jørgen Holmboe – (1902–1979) Norwegian-American meteorologist.

Military 
 Peter C. Assersen – (1839–1906) Norwegian-born, American civil engineer and Rear Admiral in the United States Navy
 Quentin Aanenson – (1921–2008) Captain of the 391st Fighter Squadron featured in Ken Burn's 2007 documentary The War
 Bernt Balchen – (1899–1973), winner of the Distinguished Flying Cross, Norwegian native and later U.S. citizen, known as a pioneer polar aviator, navigator, aircraft mechanical engineer and military leader
 Bowe Bergdahl – United States Army soldier of Norwegian and Swedish descent. Captured by the Taliban.
 Margarethe Cammermeyer – former colonel in the Washington National Guard and a gay rights activist
 Fred J. Christensen – (1921–2006) fighter pilot and ace with the United States Army Air Forces during World War II
 Gail Halvorsen – retired career officer and command pilot in the United States Air Force (The Candy Bomber)
 Louis J. Hauge, Jr. – (1924–1945) United States Marine
 Orin D. Haugen – (1907–1945) Colonel in the United States Army
 Knut Haukelid – (1911–1994) Norwegian resistance movement soldier during World War II
 Hans Christian Heg - (1829-1863) Norwegian-born abolitionist, journalist, anti-slavery activist, politician and soldier, led Scandinavian 15th Wisconsin Volunteer Regiment on Union side in American Civil War. Died of the wounds received at Battle of Chickamauga.
 Olaf M. Hustvedt – (1886–1978) United States Navy vice admiral, World War II battleship commander and twice recipient of the Legion of Merit
 Ole C. Johnson – (1838–1886) Norwegian-American soldier in the American Civil War
 Lauris Norstad – (1907–1988) American General in the United States Army Air Forces and United States Air Force
 Ralph Ofstie – (1897–1956) United States Navy vice admiral, World War II aircraft carrier commander and post war commander of the United States Sixth Fleet
 Ludwig Andreas Olsen – (1845–1886) also known as Louis Williams, United States Navy sailor
 George William Rud – (1883–1916) United States Navy Chief Machinist's Mate
 Thorvald A. Solberg – (1894–1964) United States Navy rear admiral, twice recipient of the Legion of Merit, and head of the Office of Naval Research.
 Andrew V. Stoltenberg – (1865–1921) United States Navy sailor and a recipient of the Medal of Honor for his actions in the Philippine–American War.
 Leif J. Sverdrup – (1898–1976) Norwegian-born American civil engineer and general with the U.S. Army Corps of Engineers in the first half of the 20th century.
 Jacob Thorkelson – (1876–1945) American elected official, Naval officer and medical doctor
 Karl Westa – (1875–1949) United States Navy sailor

Politicians 

 Fred G. Aandahl – (1897–1966) Republican politician that served as the 23rd Governor of North Dakota and as a U.S. Representative
 Thomas Ryum Amlie – (1897–1973) U.S. Representative from Wisconsin
 Elmer L. Andersen – (1909–2004) American businessman, philanthropist, and the 30th Governor of Minnesota
 Sigurd Anderson – (1904–1990) 19th Governor of South Dakota
 Sydney Anderson – (1881–1948) U.S. Representative from Minnesota
 John Ashcroft – United States politician, 79th United States attorney general
 Michele Bachmann – member of the United States House of Representatives, representing Minnesota's 6th congressional district
 Elmer Austin Benson – (1895–1985) American lawyer and politician from Minnesota
 Jan Brewer – 22nd Governor of Arizona
 Nils Andreas Boe – (1913–1992) American politician who served as the 23rd Governor of South Dakota
 Clarence Alfred Bottolfsen – (1891–1964) politician that served as the 17th and 19th Governor of Idaho
 Holm O. Bursum – (1867–1953) politician from New Mexico
 Olger B. Burtness – (1884–1960) U.S. Representative from North Dakota
 Lois Grimsrud Capps – U.S. Representative for California's 23rd congressional district
 Theodore Christianson – (1883–1948) American politician who served as the 21st Governor of Minnesota
 Charles A. Christopherson – (1871–1933) U.S. Representative from South Dakota
 John E. Erickson (Montana politician) – (March 14, 1863 – May 25, 1946) American politician of the Democratic Party from Montana
 Math Dahl – (1884–1976) North Dakota politician well known for his tenure as the North Dakota Commissioner of Agriculture and Labor from 1939 to 1964
 Clarence P. Dahl – (1892–1976) politician with the Republican Party who served as the Lieutenant Governor of North Dakota
 Arne Dahl – politician that served as the last North Dakota Commissioner of Agriculture and Labor
 Herman Dahle – (1855–1920) United States Congressman in the House of Representatives from Wisconsin
 James O. Davidson – (1854–1922) the 21st Governor of Wisconsin
 Roland B. Day – (1919–2008) Wisconsin Supreme Court Justice from 1974 to 1996
 Arne Duncan – American education administrator and currently United States Secretary of Education.
 Joanell Dyrstad – 43rd Lieutenant Governor of Minnesota
 Herman Ekern – (1872–1954) politician who served as Lieutenant Governor of Wisconsin
 Oscar E. Erickson – (1884–1945) politician who served as the North Dakota Insurance Commissioner
 Michael O. Freeman – attorney and politician from the state of Minnesota
 Orville Freeman – (1918–2003) American Democratic politician who served as the 29th Governor of Minnesota
 Jennifer Granholm – Canadian born American politician of Norwegian and Swedish ancestry
 Nicolai A. Grevstad – (1851–1940) American diplomat, politician and newspaper
 Asle Gronna – (1858–1922) U.S. Senator from North Dakota
 Archie M. Gubbrud – (1910–1987) the 22nd Governor of South Dakota.
 Steve Gunderson – President and CEO of the Council on Foundations
 Carl Gunderson – (1864–1933) 11th Governor of South Dakota
 Henry Gunderson – (1878–1940) Wisconsin politician
 Deb Haaland – (1960–) U.S. Representative from New Mexico
 Harold Hagen – (1901–1957) Minnesota politician
 Kittel Halvorson – (1846–1936) U.S. Representative from Minnesota
 John Hamre – U.S. politician
 Bernt B. Haugan – (1862–1931) American Lutheran minister, politician
 Mary Margaret Haugen – Washington state senator
 Gilbert N. Haugen – (1859–1933) seventeen-term Republican U.S. Representative from Iowa's 4th congressional district
 Brynhild Haugland – (1905–1998) one of the first female legislators in the North Dakota Legislative Assembly and the longest serving state legislator in the history of the United States
 Curly Haugland – born Erling George Haugland, served as the Republican National Committeeman for North Dakota since 1999
 Nils Pederson Haugen – (1849–1931) U.S. Representative from Wisconsin
 Hans Christian Heg – (1829–1863) Norwegian- American politician and soldier in the American Civil War from Wisconsin
 Ralph Herseth – (1909–1969) the 21st Governor of South Dakota
 Ole P. Hoff – (1853–1924) Norwegian-American Republican politician and the first commissioner of labor in the U.S. state of Oregon.
 Martin Hersrud – (1880–1969) Republican member of the North Dakota House of Representatives
 Einar Hoidale – (1870–1952) Norwegian-American politician
 Hubert Humphrey – (1911–1978), served under President Lyndon B. Johnson as the 38th Vice President of the United States.
 Henry M. Jackson – (1912–1983) U.S. Congressman and Senator from the state of Washington
 Tim Johnson – U.S. Senator from South Dakota
 Coya Knutson – (1912–1996) U.S. Representative from Minnesota
 Paul John Kvale – (1896–1960) U.S. Representative from Minnesota
 Ole J. Kvale – (1869–1929) U.S. Representative from Minnesota
 E. Floyd Kvamme – American engineer, venture capitalist, and government advisor
 Warren Magnuson – (1905–1989) United States Senator of the Democratic Party from Washington
 Roger Moe – American politician and former member and majority leader of the Minnesota Senate
 Walter Mondale – American Democratic Party politician, who served as the 42nd Vice President of the United States
 John Moses – (1885–1945) Norwegian-born, 22nd Governor of North Dakota and United States Senator
 Canute R. Matson – (1843–1903) Norwegian-born politician who served as Sheriff of Cook County, Illinois
 John M. Nelson – (1870–1955) U.S. Representative from Wisconsin
 Knute Nelson – (1843–1923) Norwegian-born American politician
 Ragnvald A. Nestos – (1877–1942) 13th Governor of North Dakota
 Kristi Noem - Governor of South Dakota
 Ole H. Olson – (1872–1954) elected to the North Dakota House of Representatives and later elected to the North Dakota State Senate.
 J. A. O. Preus – (1883–1961) American politician.
 Floyd B. Olson – (1891–1936) American politician, served as the 22nd Governor of Minnesota
 Allen I. Olson – Republican politician and attorney who served as the 28th Governor of North Dakota
 Sean Parnell – Governor of Alaska
 Al Quie – American politician who served as the 35th Governor of Minnesota
 Karl Rolvaag – U.S. politician
 Karl Rove – American Republican political consultant and policy advisor
 Martin Olav Sabo – American politician and member of the Democratic-Farmer-Labor Party
 Stephanie Herseth Sandlin – Attorney who served as the Democratic U.S. Representative for South Dakota's At-large congressional district
 Conrad Selvig – (1877–1953) U.S. Representative from Minnesota
 Henrik Shipstead – (1881–1960) American politician
 Arlan Stangeland – American politician from Minnesota
 Halvor Steenerson – (1852–1926) U.S. Congressman from Minnesota
 Henry Teigan – (1881–1941) American labor leader, editor and member of the United States House of Representatives from Minnesota.
 Jacob Thorkelson – (1876–1945) U.S. Congressman from Wyoming
 John Thune – U.S. Senator from South Dakota
 Edward John Thye – (1896–1969) 26th Governor of Minnesota and U.S. Senator
 Andrew Volstead – (1860–1947) American member of the United States House of Representatives from Minnesota
 Knud Wefald – (1869–1936) United States House of Representatives from Minnesota
 William Williamson – (1875–1972) U.S. Representantive from South Dakota
 Harold Windingstad – (1929–2006) American politician from Minnesota

Published 
 John Anderson – (1836–1910) Norwegian-born publisher.
 Tavi Gevinson – American writer, magazine editor, actress and singer.

Religious 
 Marcus Borg – American Biblical scholar and author
 Elling Eielsen – (1804–1883) American minister and Lutheran Church leader.
 John O. Evjen  – (1874–1942) American author, Lutheran church historian and professor of theology
 Albert C. Knudson – (1873–1953) Christian theologian in the Methodist tradition
 U. V. Koren – (1826–1910) American author, theologian and church leader
 Bernt Julius Muus – (1832–1900) Norwegian-born, Lutheran minister and church leader
 Russell M. Nelson – President of the Church of Jesus Christ of Latter-day Saints
 Olaf M. Norlie – (1876–1962), also referred to as O. M. Norlie, Lutheran minister, educator and scholar
 Sven Oftedal – (1844–1911) Norwegian-born, Lutheran minister who helped found the Lutheran Free Church
 Jacob Aall Ottesen Preus – American Lutheran clergy
 J. A. O. Preus II – (1920–1994) Lutheran pastor, professor, author, and church president
 Herman Amberg Preus – (1825–1894) American Lutheran clergyman and church leader
 Canute Peterson – (1824–1902) Norwegian Mormon pioneer settler of Utah Territory
 Christian Keyser Preus – (1852–1921) American Lutheran Minister who served as the second President of Luther College
 Robert Preus – (1924–1995) American Lutheran pastor, professor, author, and seminary president
 August Weenaas – (1835–1924) Norwegian-born Lutheran minister and educator
 William S. Skylstad – American Roman Catholic Bishop
 Peer Stromme – (1856–1921) American pastor, teacher, journalist, and author
 Hans Gerhard Stub – (1849–1931) American Lutheran theologian and church leader
 Georg Sverdrup (theologian) – (1848–1907) Norwegian-born Lutheran theologian and an educator
 Nils Otto Tank – (1800–1864) Moravian Church missionary
 Jacob Tanner – Norwegian-born, Lutheran minister, educator and religious author
 Abraham Vereide – (1886–1969) Norwegian-born Methodist clergyman and founder of Goodwill Industries of Seattle
 John A. Widtsoe – (1872–1952) member of the Quorum of the Twelve Apostles of The Church of Jesus Christ of Latter-Day Saints
 Mildred Bangs Wynkoop – (1905–1997) ordained minister in the Church of the Nazarene, who served as an educator, missionary and theologian

Scientists 

 Philip Abelson – (1913–2004) American physicist, scientific editor, and science writer
 Christian B. Anfinsen – (1916–1995) American biochemist
 Peter Agre – American medical doctor, professor, and molecular biologist
  Neal Amundson – (1916–2011) American chemical engineer
 John August Anderson - (1876 – 1959) was an American astronomer. The crater Anderson on the Moon is named after him
 Erik Asphaug – American planetary scientist, winner of Urey Prize
 Gunvald Aus – (1851–1950) Norwegian-American engineer
 Daniel Baker - (1948- ) American space scientist
 Earl Bakken – engineer, businessman and philanthropist of Dutch and Norwegian American ancestry
 Carl Georg Barth – (1860–1939) Norwegian-American mathematician and mechanical engineer
 Magnus Bjorndal – (September 13, 1899 – January 23, 1971) Norwegian American engineer and inventor
 Eduard Boeckmann – (1849–1927) Norwegian American ophthalmologist, physician and inventor
 William A. Bugge – (1900–1992) civil engineer
 Robert A. Dahl – Sterling Professor emeritus of political science at Yale University
 Olin J. Eggen – (1919–1998) American astronomer
 Douglas Engelbart – American inventor and early computer pioneer and internet pioneer
 Ole Evinrude – (1877–1934) Norwegian-American inventor, known for the invention of the first outboard motor with practical commercial application.
 Joe Foss – (1915–2003) leading fighter ace of the United States Marine Corps during World War II
 Mike Fossum – American astronaut
 Frederick C. Finkle – (1865–1949) American consulting engineer and geologist
 Ivar Giaever – physicist who won the Nobel Prize in Physics in 1973
 Clarence Gonstead – (1898–1978) Doctor of Chiropractic and creator of the Gonstead Technique
 Lars Grimsrud – aerospace engineer and performance automobile
 Adolph Gundersen – (1865–1938) Norwegian-born American medical doctor and founder of Gundersen Lutheran Medical Center
 Robert C. Gunderson – (1931–2003) first supervisor of the Genealogical Society of Utah's Royalty Identification Unit
 Lawrence R. Hafstad – 1904–1993) American physicist and son of two Norwegian immigrants. Created first nuclear fission reaction in the United States.
 Alf Hjort – (1877–1944) Norwegian-born American electrical engineer

 Iver Johnson – U.S. firearms, bicycle, and motorcycle manufacturer
 Robert B. Ingebretsen – (1948–2003) pioneer in the development of digital sound
 Gary Kildall – (1942–1994) American computer scientist and microcomputer entrepreneur who created the CP/M operating system and founded Digital Research, Inc.
 Carl Otto Lampland – (1873–1951) American astronomer
 Norman Bernard Larsen (1923–1970) American industrial chemist who is sometimes credited with the invention of WD-40.
 Ernest Lawrence – (1901–1958) American physicist and Nobel Laureate
 John H. Lawrence – (1904–1991) American physicist and physician best known for pioneering the field of nuclear medicine
 Mark C. Lee – (1952–) American astronaut
 C. Walton Lillehei – (1918–1999) American surgeon who pioneered open-heart surgery
 Alfred M. Moen – (1916–2001) American inventor and founder of Moen, Inc.
 Olaus Murie – (1889–1963) called the "father of modern elk management", was a naturalist, author, and wildlife biologist
 Nathan Myhrvold – formerly Chief Technology Officer at Microsoft, is co-founder of Intellectual Ventures, and referred to by many as a patent troll.
 Ted Nelson – American sociologist, philosopher, and pioneer of information technology
 Peter Norman Nissen – (1871–1930) Canadian-American resident in United States. A mining engineer, developed the prefabricated shelter called the Nissen hut in 1916
 Karen Nyberg, mechanical engineer and retired NASA astronaut. Nyberg became the 50th woman in space on her first mission in 2008. First person to ever sew in space.
 Ken Olsen – (1926–2011) American engineer who co-founded Digital Equipment Corporation
 Tinius Olsen – (1845–1932) Norwegian-born American engineer and inventor
 Charles J. Pedersen – (1904–1989) American organic chemist best known for describing methods of synthesizing crown ethers
 Lars Onsager – (1903–1976) Norwegian-born American physical chemist and theoretical physicist
 Sally Ride – (1951–2012) American physicist and former NASA astronaut
 Ole Singstad – (1882–1969) Norwegian-American civil engineer who innovated the ventilation system for the Holland Tunnel
 Marius Nygaard Smith-Petersen – (1886–1953) Norwegian-born American physician and orthopaedic surgeon
 George Schlukbier – North American innovator who in the 1990s built Nando
 Elias Anton Cappelen Smith – (1873–1949) Norwegian American civil engineer and metallurgist
 Theodore Theodorsen – (1897–1978) Norwegian-American theoretical aerodynamicist noted for his work at NACA (the forerunner of NASA) and for his contributions to the study of turbulence
 Merle A. Tuve – (1901–1982) American scientist and geophysicist, the founding director of the Johns Hopkins University Applied Physics Laboratory
 Oswald Veblen – (1880–1960) American mathematician, geometer and topologist

Seamen 
 Erik Eriksen (explorer) – (1820–1888) Norwegian ice sea captain born in Lyngør, Norway
 Thea Foss – (1857–1927) the founder of Foss Maritime, the largest tugboat company in the western United States.
 Andrew Furuseth – (1854–1938) Norwegian-born merchant seaman and American labor lead
 Sig Hansen (1966– ) – TV personality, and Captain of the fishing vessel Northwestern, featured in the TV series Deadliest Catch
 Harry Lundeberg – (1901–1957) merchant seaman and an American labor leader.
 G. Unger Vetlesen – (1889–1959) Norwegian shipbuilder and naturalized American philanthropist

Settlers 
 Carl Martin Bergh – (1849–1906) Norwegian immigrant of United States who is most associated with the resettlement of fellow Scandinavian families to the area of James City County and York County surrounding the community of Norge, Virginia.
 Valdemar Knudsen – (1819–1898) sugar cane plantation pioneer on west Kauai, Hawaii
 Cleng Peerson – (1783–1865) Norwegian-born pioneer who led the first group of Norwegians to emigrated to the United States
 James M. Wahl – (1846–1939) Norwegian-born settler and the first legislator of Lincoln County, South Dakota

Visual artists 
 Mikkel Aaland – American photographer known for work in the early days of digital photography
 Hendrik Christian Andersen – (1872–1940) American sculptor, painter and urban planner
 Gene Amondson – (1943–2009) landscape painter, woodcarver, Christian minister and prohibition activist
 Sigvald Asbjornsen – (1867–1954) Norwegian-born sculptor
 Earl W. Bascom – (1906–1995) cowboy artist and sculptor, "cowboy of cowboy artists"
 Jon-Erik Beckjord – (1939–2008) paranormal investigator and photographer known for his far-reaching ideas regarding such phenomena as UFOs, crop circles, the Loch Ness Monster, and his specialty, Bigfoot
 Emil Biorn – (1864–1935) Norwegian-born, American sculptor, painter and composer
 Benjamin Blessum – (1877–1954) American painter, graphic artist and illustrator
 Bjorn Egeli – (1900–1984) Norwegian-born portrait artist
 Jacob Fjelde – (1855–1896) Norwegian-born American sculptor
 Pauline Fjelde – (1861–1923) Norwegian-born American painter, embroiderer, and textile artist
 Paul Fjelde – (1892–1984) noted American sculptor and educator
 Alexander Grinager – (1865–1949) American artist most noted for his murals and scenic painting
 Herbjørn Gausta – (1854–1924) American artist best known for his landscapes, portraits and scenes from rural settings
 Al Hansen – (1927–1995) American artist considered one of the most important Fluxus figures
 Lars Jonson Haukaness – (1863–1929) Norwegian-born American-Canadian impressionist painter and art instructor
 Per Lysne – (1880–1947) artist most associated with bringing the traditional Norwegian folk art of Rosemaling to the United States
 Eric Norstad – noted ceramicist and architect
 Karl Ouren – (1882–1943) Norwegian-born artist best known for his paintings of Norwegian landscapes and scenes
 Shag – American artist
 Yngvar Sonnichsen – (1873–1938) Norwegian-born American artist and painter
 Svend Rasmussen Svendsen – (1864–1945) Norwegian-born American impressionist artist.
 Trygve Rovelstad – (1903–1990) renowned sculptor and designer of medals
 Dan Weggeland – (1827–1918) considered the "Father of Utah Art", artist and teacher in the early history of Utah

Writers and editors

 Rasmus B. Anderson – (1846–1936) American author, professor, and diplomat
 Christopher Bakken – American poet, translator, and professor at Allegheny College
 Robert Bly – American poet, author, activist and leader of the Mythopoetic men's movement
 Hjalmar Hjorth Boyesen – (1848–1895) Norwegian-born author and college professor
 Dorthea Dahl – (1881–1958) Norwegian-born, American writer
 George Helgesen Fitch – (1877–1915) American author, humorist, and journalist
 Rolf G. Fjelde – (1926–2002) American playwright, educator and poet
 Kathryn Forbes – (1908–1966) American writer and memoirist
 George T. Flom – (1871–1960) American professor of linguistics and author of numerous reference books
 Greta Gaard – ecofeminist writer, scholar, activist, and documentary filmmaker
 Rudolph Hjalmar Gjelsness – (1894–1968) prominent American librarian and literary translator who served as Dean of the University of Michigan's Library Science Department
 Ingebrikt Grose – (1862–1939) author, college professor and founding president of Concordia College
 Haldor Johan Hanson – (1856–1929) American hymn writer, publisher and author
 Gregory T. Haugan – American author and expert in the field of work breakdown structure
 Eva Lund Haugen – (1907–1996) American author and editor
 Einar Haugen – (1906–1994) American linguist, author and Professor at University of Wisconsin–Madison and Harvard University
 Michael Hauge – script consultant, author and lecturer
 Johan Andreas Holvik – (1880–1960) author and professor at Concordia College in Moorhead, Minnesota
 Siri Hustvedt – American writer, novelist
 Randolph Edgar Haugan – (1902–1985) American author, editor and publisher
 Simon Johnson – (1874–1970) Norwegian-born American novelist
 Harold Knutson – American editor
 Arne Brun Lie – (1925–2010) Norwegian-American author and Holocaust survivor
 Greg Mortenson – American humanitarian, professional speaker, writer, and former mountaineer
 Gerhard Brandt Naeseth – (1913–1994) American librarian and genealogist
 Ingri Parin d'Aulaire – writer and illustrator of children's books in the 20th century
 Ole Edvart Rølvaag – (1876–1931) American novelist and professor
 Aagot Raaen – (1873–1957) American author and educator
 Peter Straub – American author and poet
 Elise Wærenskjold – (1815–1895) Norwegian-American writer
 Agnes Mathilde Wergeland – (1857–1914) Norwegian-American historian, poet and educator

Others 

 Gunvald Aus – Norwegian-American engineer, most associated with the engineering of the Woolworth Building in New York City together with fellow Norwegian Kort Berle
 Gunnar Berg (Scouting) – (1897–1987) national director of the Boy Scouts of America
 Norman Borlaug – (1914–2009) American agronomist, humanitarian, and Nobel laureate who has been called "the father of the Green Revolution"
 Ward Christensen - co-founder of bulletin board system (BBS)
 Ophelia Dahl – American social justice and health care advocate
 Steve Dahl – Chicago radio personality and humorist
 Jeffrey Dahmer — Serial killer; Mother was from Norwegian ancestry
 Helga Estby – (1860–1942) Norwegian-American immigrant most noted for her walk across the United States during 1896
 David Grose – (1944–2004) world-renowned authority on the classification of early ancient glass from the Roman period
 Robert Hanssen – spied for Soviet and Russian intelligence services against the United States
 George Harbo – (1870–1946) Norwegian-born American who in 1896, became the first people ever to row across an ocean.
 Alf Gundersen
 Belle Gunness – (1859–c. 1908) Norwegian-born American serial killer
 Frances Haugen - American data engineer and scientist, product manager, and whistleblower.
 Clint Hill (Secret Service) – Secret Service agent who was the one that jumped onto the back of President JFK's car during assassination.
 Paris Hilton – American heiress and media personality. She is a great-granddaughter of Conrad Hilton (founder of Hilton Hotels)
 Oscar Hauge – (1868–1945) served on the Los Angeles County Board of Supervisors
 Merle Hansen – (1919–2009) founding president of the North American Farm Alliance and a spokesman for the plight of family farmers.
 Thom Hartmann – (born 1951) Progressive/liberal talk radio host and author. Founded the theory of the Hunter vs. farmer hypothesis in regard to Attention deficit hyperactivity disorder. Founded The Hunter School in Rumney, New Hampshire – which he co-founded with his wife Louise.
 Clarence Iverson – popular radio personalities in the Midwest during the 1930s and 1940s
 Gunnar Kaasen – (1882–1960) Norwegian-born musher who delivered a cylinder containing 300,000 units of diphtheria antitoxin to Nome, Alaska, in 1925, as the last leg of a dog sled relay that saved the U.S. city from an epidemic
 Eliot Ness – (1903–1957) American Prohibition agent, famous for his efforts to enforce Prohibition in Chicago, Illinois, also the leader of team The Untouchables
 Pat Paulsen – (1927–1997) American comedian and satirist notable for his roles on several of the Smothers Brothers TV shows, and for his campaigns for President of the United States
 Gary O. Rollefson – American anthropologist
 Frank Samuelsen – (1870–1946) Norwegian-born American who in 1896, became the first people ever to row across an ocean
 Tim Schafer – American computer game designer
 Henry Seadlund - Kidnapper and killer who received the death sentence and was put to death by electric chair in Cook County Jail, Chicago, Illinois
 Nels Skumsrud
 Jacqueline Smith – Norwegian trade unionist
 Thorvald Solberg – (1852–1949) first Register of Copyrights (1897–1930) in the United States Copyright Office
 Frank Stephenson - (born 1959) Automobile designer
 Kevin Alfred Strom – former managing director of National Vanguard
 Per Ivarson Undi – (1803–1860) also known as Peter Iverson, early Norwegian-American homesteader in Wisconsin Territory

See also
 List of Norwegians
 Norwegians

References
Bill gates become the richest person in world Click here to see

Norwegian Americans

Americans
Norwegian